Pano Aqil Cantonment is a cantonment in Pano Aqil, Sindh, Pakistan. It is located 40 km from Sukkur.

See also
 Army Cantonment Board, Pakistan
 Pano Aqil

References 

 District Census Report Sukkur 2000, Census Bureau of Pakistan, Government of Pakistan
 Labour Force Survey 2004, Federal Bureau of Statistics, Government of Pakistan

Cantonments of Pakistan
Sukkur District